Mount Ermatinger is located on the border of Alberta and British Columbia, NE of Kinbasket Lake. It was named in 1920 by Arthur O. Wheeler for Edward Ermatinger.

See also
 List of peaks on the British Columbia–Alberta border
 List of mountains in the Canadian Rockies

References

Three-thousanders of Alberta
Three-thousanders of British Columbia
Canadian Rockies
Mountains of Jasper National Park